HMS Chepstow was a  of the Royal Navy built in 1916. The Racecourse Class (also called the Ascot Class) comprised 32 paddlewheel coastal minesweeping sloops. The vessel was named for Chepstow Racecourse.

The ship's bell is in St. Mary's Church, Chepstow.

See also
 , a corvette cancelled in 1943

References

Racecourse-class minesweepers
Royal Navy ship names
1916 ships